Alexander Younger Craig (30 March 1884 – 25 June 1945) was a Scottish-born American character actor, particularly known for his roles in Mutiny on the Bounty (1935) and National Velvet (1944). He was particularly known for portraying stereotypically tight-fisted Scotsmen.

Early life 
Alec Craig was born on 30 March 1884 in Dunfermline, Fife, Scotland, the son of James Chapman Craig and his wife Isabella.

Personal life 
He married his wife Margaret L. (born 8 July 1888 in Dunfermline) in Edinburgh on 24 September 1919. They arrived in the United States on 2 November 1919. They had a son James C Craig (born 4 December 1922, Berkeley, California). He became a naturalized American citizen on 14 July 1939.

Death 
Craig died of tuberculosis on 25 June 1945, aged 61, in Glendale, California. He is buried there at Grand View Memorial Park Cemetery.

Partial filmography

 The Little Minister (1934) – Villager Saying 'Reverend Is Single' (uncredited)
 Sweepstake Annie (1935) – 2nd Sweepstakes Ticket Seller (uncredited)
 Vanessa: Her Love Story (1935) – Worker for George (uncredited)
 Born to Gamble (1935) – Prospector at Card Game (uncredited)
 The Old Homestead (1935) – Townsman (uncredited)
 Dressed to Thrill (1935) – Scottish Soldier (uncredited)
 Mutiny on the Bounty (1935) – McCoy
 Little Lord Fauntleroy (1936) – Townsman at Church (uncredited)
 Mary of Scotland (1936) – Donal
 Winterset (1936) – Hobo
 That Girl from Paris (1936) – Justice of the Peace (uncredited)
 China Passage (1937) – Harvey Dinwiddle
 The Man Who Found Himself (1937) – Hobo (uncredited)
 The Woman I Love (1937) – Doctor
 There Goes My Girl (1937) – 'Godfrey' – a Hobo
 Parnell (1937) – Middle-Aged Man (uncredited)
 Meet the Missus (1937) – College President
 Border Cafe (1937) – Whitney Driver (uncredited)
 Super-Sleuth (1937) – Eddie – Doorman
 The Big Shot (1937) – Druggist (uncredited)
 Hideaway (1937) – Jerry Nolan
 Wise Girl (1937) – Dermont O'Neil
 She's Got Everything (1937) – Justice of the Peace (uncredited)
 Crashing Hollywood (1938) – Movie Studio Receptionist
 Double Danger (1938) – Theron's Gardener
 Condemned Women (1938) – Counterman on Ship (uncredited)
 This Marriage Business (1938) – Judge Barrows (uncredited)
 Vivacious Lady (1938) – Joseph – Chauffeur
 Lord Jeff (1938) – Gardener (uncredited)
 If I Were King (1938) – Spy (uncredited)
 Crime Takes a Holiday (1938) – Cleaning Man (uncredited)
 The Arkansas Traveler (1938) – Drunken Printer (uncredited)
 The Lone Wolf Spy Hunt (1939) – Marriage License Bureau Clerk (uncredited)
 They Made Her a Spy (1939) – Canby
 Let Us Live (1939) – Bookkeeper Juror (uncredited)
 Confessions of a Nazi Spy (1939) – McGregor – Scottish Postman (uncredited)
 Bachelor Mother (1939) – Store Watchman (uncredited)
 Career (1939) – Jody (uncredited)
 Night Work (1939) – Mr. Day (uncredited)
 Mr. Smith Goes to Washington (1939) – Speaker (uncredited)
 Rulers of the Sea (1939) – Foreman
 The Secret of Dr. Kildare (1939) – Telephone Repair Man (uncredited)
 Charlie McCarthy, Detective (1939) – Bounds (uncredited)
 The Earl of Chicago (1940) – Fingal's Son (uncredited)
 The Blue Bird (1940) – Groom (uncredited)
 Abe Lincoln in Illinois (1940) – Trum Cogdall
 Zanzibar (1940) – Sailor Brown (uncredited)
 Three Cheers for the Irish (1940) – Callaghan
 And One Was Beautiful (1940) – Michael – Chauffeur (uncredited)
 Phantom Raiders (1940) – Andy MacMillan
 Tom Brown's School Days (1940) – Old Thomas
 Queen of the Mob (1940) – Proprietor (uncredited)
 The Sea Hawk (1940) – Chartmaker
 Golden Gloves (1940) – Editor MacDonald
 Stranger on the Third Floor (1940) – Defense Attorney
 I'm Still Alive (1940) – Mr. Briggs (scenes deleted)
 A Dispatch from Reuter's (1940) – Editor Grant of the Morning Advertiser (uncredited)
 Mr. & Mrs. Smith (1941) – Thomas – Beefeaters Club Clerk (uncredited)
 Meet the Chump (1941) – Justice (uncredited)
 Footlight Fever (1941) – Hattie Drake's Butler (uncredited)
 That Hamilton Woman (1941) – Ship's Minister (uncredited)
 Barnacle Bill (1941) – MacDonald
 Ride on Vaquero (1941) – Waiter Limey (uncredited)
 Shining Victory (1941) – Jeweler
 Out of the Fog (1941) – Man Reporting Fire to Magruder (uncredited)
 Dr. Jekyll and Mr. Hyde (1941) – Tripped Waiter (uncredited)
 The Devil and Daniel Webster (1941) – Eli Higgins (uncredited)
 Three Girls About Town (1941) – Samuel – Potential Casket Customer
 Suspicion (1941) – Hogarth Club Desk Clerk (uncredited)
 The Lone Star Ranger (1942)
 A Date with the Falcon (1942) – Waldo Sampsom / Herman Sampson (uncredited)
 To Be or Not to Be (1942) – Scottish Farmer Without Mustache (uncredited)
 Roxie Hart (1942) – Idler (uncredited)
 The Night Before the Divorce (1942) – Jitters Noonan
 This Above All (1942) – Bus Conductor (uncredited)
 The Mad Martindales (1942) – Coachman
 Mrs. Miniver (1942) – Joe (uncredited)
 The Old Homestead (1942) – McTavish (uncredited)
 The Loves of Edgar Allan Poe (1942) – Angus – Boston Printer (uncredited)
 Wildcat (1942) – Joseph D. Campbell
 Orchestra Wives (1942) – Henry Fink
 Northwest Rangers (1942) – Mac McKenzie – Ship's Mate (uncredited)
 Wrecking Crew (1942) – Charlie
 The Undying Monster (1942) – Will, the Groundsman (uncredited)
 Cat People (1942) – Zookeeper (uncredited)
 Life Begins at Eight-Thirty (1942) – Santa Claus
 Random Harvest (1942) – Comedian (uncredited)
 Tennessee Johnson (1942) – Sam Andrews
 Forever and a Day (1943) – Ambrose Pomfret's Butler
 Action in the North Atlantic (1943) – McGonigle (uncredited)
 It's a Great Life (1943) – Alf (uncredited)
 Coney Island (1943) – Billy (uncredited)
 Appointment in Berlin (1943) – Smitty – News Vendor (uncredited)
 Holy Matrimony (1943) – Aylmer (uncredited)
 Johnny Come Lately (1943) – Court Bailiff (uncredited)
 Lassie Come Home (1943) – Buckles
 Northern Pursuit (1943) – Angus McBain
 The Spider Woman (1943) – Radlik
 The Ghost Ship (1943) – Blind Beggar (uncredited)
 Calling Dr. Death (1943) – Bill – the Watchman
 Jane Eyre (1943) – Footman (uncredited)
 Career Girl (1944) – Theodore 'Pop' Billings – the Landlord
 Passport to Destiny (1944) – Freighter's Cook (uncredited)
 Gaslight (1944) – Turnkey (uncredited)
 The White Cliffs of Dover (1944) – Billings (uncredited)
 Ghost Catchers (1944) – Diggs (uncredited)
 Jungle Woman (1944) – Caretaker
 Mystery of the River Boat (1944) – Chief Engineer
 The Woman in the Window (1944) – Garage Man (uncredited)
 And Now Tomorrow (1944) – Mr. Meade (uncredited)
 National Velvet (1944) – Tim
 Dangerous Passage (1944) – Dawson the Steward
 Tonight and Every Night (1945) – Englishman (uncredited)
 The House of Fear (1945) – Angus (uncredited)
 Bring On the Girls (1945) – Stage Doorman (uncredited)
 A Tree Grows in Brooklyn (1945) – Werner (uncredited)
 The Brighton Strangler (1945) – Vacuuming Bellhop (uncredited)
 Love Letters (1945) – Dodd (uncredited)
 Kitty (1945) – McNab (uncredited)
 Girl on the Spot (1946) – Murgatroid (uncredited)
 Three Strangers (1946) – Man on Park Bench (uncredited) (final film role)

References

External links

 

1884 births
1945 deaths
Scottish male film actors
20th-century Scottish male actors
People from Dunfermline
Naturalized citizens of the United States
Burials at Grand View Memorial Park Cemetery
20th-century deaths from tuberculosis
Tuberculosis deaths in California
Scottish emigrants to the United States